Ciriaco S. "Acoy" Calalang (c. 1951 – September 23, 2018) was a Philippine legal academic and politician representing Kabalikat ng Mamamayan.

He taught law at the university level and specialized in taxation law. Despite concerns raised by Harry Roque, Calalang took office in the House of Representatives on January 20, 2018, succeeding Roque, who was named presidential spokesman. Calalang was admitted to the De Los Santos Medical Center for surgery on September 17. He died of a stroke in hospital on September 23, 2018, aged 67.

References

1950s births
2018 deaths
Party-list members of the House of Representatives of the Philippines
20th-century Filipino lawyers